The Institute of Modern Languages Research is a research institution associated with the University of London. A constituent institute of the School of Advanced Study based on the second floor of the Senate House, the Institute of Modern Languages Research promotes and facilitates national and international collaborative, cross-disciplinary and cross-cultural research by means of seminars, lectures, workshops, colloquia, conferences, a fellowships programme, and its various research centres.

History 

The Institute of Germanic Studies was founded in 1950 to promote and facilitate the study of German-speaking cultures. It was joined in 1989 by the Institute of Romance Studies, which was founded to promote and facilitate the study of Romance language-speaking cultures. The two institutes were merged in 2004 to form the new Institute of Germanic & Romance Studies. It became the Institute of Modern Languages Research in 2013, when its Euro-centric focus began broadening significantly to encompass the study of all languages currently spoken around the world. The institute has since also come to engage directly in emerging interlingual and inter-disciplinary topics such as translingualism and translation.

From April 2021 it has further broadened its scope as it has included Latin American Studies through the establishment of the Centre for Latin American and Caribbean Studies (CLACS), formerly the Institute of Latin American Studies (ILAS).

Degrees 

As well as offering doctoral supervision, and co-supervision as a member of the London Arts & Humanities Partnership (LAHP), the institute currently offers a Masters by Research postgraduate degree MRes in Modern Languages.

Research degrees are offered in the modern languages, broadly conceived. The institute has significant expertise, archival strengths and student funding in its historical focus:
 Germanic Studies (German language, literature and cultural studies)
 Romance Studies (French, Italian, Spanish and Portuguese language, literature and cultural studies)
 Comparative and Interdisciplinary studies (The City-especially Berlin or Trieste, The virtual or imagined city, Borders, The body, Psychoanalysis, German philosophy and history of ideas, Women's writing, Jewish writing, Exile writing, Children's literature and Feminism).
Latin American Studies
However, along with the new, broader remit of the institute, the range and fluidity of its expertise have also increased significantly in recent years.

Affiliated Research Centres 

Several research centres are affiliated with the institute, including
 Centre for the Study of Cultural Memory
 Centre for the Study of Contemporary Women's Writing
 Ingeborg Bachmann Centre for Austrian Literature
 Research Centre for German and Austrian Exile Studies
 Centre for Quebec and French-Canadian Studies
 Ernst Bloch Centre for German Thought
 Centre for Latin American and Caribbean Studies (CLACS)

Events and activities 
The institute organises and hosts a large number of  events around the year, promoting and facilitating research into a very broad range of modern languages and Latin American studies topics. The vast majority of these events are free of charge and open to everyone, from scholars and students of London colleges and universities, to interested members of the public. These events draw leading scholars in Modern Languages and Latin American Studies from around the United Kingdom and world to London to share their findings.

Fellowships 

The institute is also host to a large number of stipendiary and non-stipendiary fellowships, which allow leaders in modern languages and Latin American studies research fields at various stages of their careers to spend time at the institute, undertaking advanced research production, promotion, and facilitation activities.

Archives 
 Archive of the Anglo-Austrian Society [AAS]
 Berthold Auerbach Collection and Archive of Germanic Drama
 Mary Beare Papers [MBE]
 Jethro Bithell Papers [JBI]
 Karl H. Breul Papers [KHB]
 E. M. Butler Papers
 August Closs Papers
 Elizabeth Closs-Traugott Papers
 Hannah Closs Papers
 Archive of the English Goethe Society
 Exile Archive
 Leonard W. Forster Papers
 H. F. Garten Papers
 History and Development of German Studies [HGS]
 Friedrich Gundolf Archive (Printed Catalogues only) [FGU]
 Sylvia Harris Papers
 Ida Herz Papers
 Archives of the Institute of Germanic Studies [IGS]
 James Blair Leishman Correspondence and Diaries
 Herbert Löwit Papers
 Rudolf Majut Papers
 Martin Miller and Hannah Norbert-Miller Archive
 Margaret Mynatt / Yvonne Kapp Papers
 Robert Priebsch Papers
 William Rose Papers
 J. P. Stern Papers
 Herbert Thoma Papers
 Gilbert Waterhouse Papers
 Marianne Wynn Papers

Collections that have so far only undergone initial sorting and listing include:
 The papers of Dr P. V. Brady
 Norman McCann Collection (German and Austrian theatre programmes)
 Papers of Professor L. A. Willoughby and Professor E. M. Wilkinson

Resources in Latin American Studies 
Through its Centre for Latin American and Caribbean Studies (CLACS), the IMLR hosts and curates a range of digital, open access resources that seek to facilitate research in the field of Latin American studies. These include:

 Research Portal
 Library and E-Resources
 The Caribbean Studies Collection
 The Legal Cultures of the Subsoil Database

References

External links 
Homepage
Research Outputs of IMLR on SAS-Space repository

School of Advanced Study
University of London
Educational institutions established in 2004
2004 establishments in England